Salomėja Bačinskaitė-Bučienė, mostly known by her pen name Nėris (17 November 1904 – 7 July 1945) was a Lithuanian poet.

Biography 
Salomėja was born in Kiršai, Suwałki Governorate (current district of Vilkaviškis). She graduated from the University of Lithuania where she studied Lithuanian and German language and literature.

After she was a teacher in Lazdijai, Kaunas, and Panevėžys, her first collection of poems titled  (In the Early Morning), was published in 1927.

In 1928, Salomėja graduated from the university and was appointed to teach German language at the gymnasium of the Žiburys Society in Lazdijai. Until 1931, Nėris contributed to nationalist and Roman Catholic publications. While studying German in Vienna, in 1929, Salomėja met Lithuanian medical student Bronius Zubrickas and became attracted to him. Zubrickas had socialist views and Salomėja engaged in socialist activities in order to court him.

In 1931, Salomėja moved to live in Kaunas, where she gave lessons and edited Lithuanian folk tales. In the second collection of Salomėja's poetry,  (The Footprints in the Sand), there is evidence of the onset of a profound spiritual crisis. In the same year, verses containing revolutionary motifs were published in the pro-communist literary journal Trečias frontas (The Third Front).

A promise to work for communism was also published. However, it was not written by her.

Salomėja Nėris was awarded the State Literature Prize in 1938.
She was a member of the Catholic youth and student organization Ateitis.

Activities during the Soviet occupation
Controversy surrounds her involvement with the Soviet occupation. She was appointed as a deputy to the Soviet-backed People's Seimas and was a member of the delegation 
to the Supreme Soviet of the Soviet Union to request Lithuania be accepted into the Soviet Union.

Salomėja was requested to write a poem in honour of Stalin and was subsequently awarded the Stalin Prize (posthumously, in 1947). After that, she wrote more verses on the theme, as encouraged by the Soviet Communist Party officials. She spent World War II in the Russian SFSR.

Salomėja Nėris returned to Kaunas but was diagnosed and died of liver cancer in a Moscow hospital in 1945. Her last poems show deep affection for Lithuania itself. She was buried in Kaunas, in a square of the Museum of Culture, and later re-interred in the Cemetery of Petrašiūnai.

Pseudonym
Her original pen name was Neris, the name of the second biggest Lithuanian river. In 1940, she received a letter from her students calling her a traitor to her homeland and asking her not to use the name of the River Neris. She added a grave accent to the "e" and used only the pen name Nėris, which until then had no particular meaning.

Works 

 . – Kaunas: , 1931. – 61p.
 . – Kaunas: , 1931. – 48p.
 . – Kaunas: , 1934. – 160p.
 . – [Kaunas]: , [1935]. – 48p.
 . – Kaunas: , 1938. – 69p.
 . – Kaunas: , 1940. – 107p.
 . – Kaunas: , 1940. – 16p.
 . – Kaunas: , 1941. – 192p.
 . – Kaunas: , 1943. – 39p.
 . – Kaunas: , 1945. – 109p.
 . – [Kaunas]: , 1946. – 96p.
 : [2t.]. – Kaunas: , 1946.
 . – Kaunas: , 1947. – 48p.
 . – Chicago, 1947. – 112p.
 . – Vilnius: , 1950. – 276p.
 . – Vilnius: , 1951. – 84p.
 . – Vilnius: , 1951. – 36p.
 . – Vilnius: , 1953. – 38p.
 . – Vilnius: , 1954. – 500p.
 . – Vilnius: , 1956. – 164p.
 . – [Vilnius]: , 1957.
 . – Kaunas: , 1958. – 112p. –.
 . – Vilnius: , 1959. – 474p.
 . – Vilnius: , 1961. – 51p.
 . – Vilnius: , 1961. – 511p.
 . – Warszaw: , 1963. – 34p. – in Polish
 . – Vilnius: , 1964. – 143p.
 . – Kaunas: , 1965. – 90p. –.
 . – Vilnius: , 1966. – 25 p.
 . – Vilnius: , 1966
 . – Vilnius: , 1967.
 . – Vilnius: , 1967. – in Russian
 . – Moscow: Chudožestvennaja literatura, 1971. – 230p. – in Russian
 . – Vilnius: , 1972. – 2 volumes
 . – Vilnius: , 1973. – 151p.
 , translation by Daina Avotiņa. – Rīga: , 1974. – 58p. – in Latvian
 . – Vilnius: , 1974. – 477p.
 . – Vilnius: , 1978. – 469p.
 . – Vilnius: , 1979. – 827p.
 . – Moscow: Chudožestvennaja literatura, 1979. – 334p. – in Russian
 . – Vilnius: , 1980. – 38p.
 . – Vilnius: , 1980. – 201p.
 . – Vilnius: , 1983. – 103p.
 . – Rīga: , 1984. – 129p. – in Latvian
 : 3 volumes – Vilnius: , 1984.
 Blue sister, river Vilija =  = . – Moscow: , 1987. – 261p. – in English and Russian
 . – Vilnius: , 1988. – 160p. –. – in Russian
 : poem, translation by M. Petrov. – Vilnius: , 1989. – 62p. – in Russian
 , translation by M. Stempkowska. – Kaunas: , 1989. – 221p. – in Polish
 . – Vilnius: , 1994. – 96p.
 . – Vilnius: , 1995. – 220p.
 . – Vilnius: , 1998. – 126p.

References

External links 
 Lithuanian Classic Literature Anthology: Salomėja Nėris

1904 births
1945 deaths
People from Vilkaviškis District Municipality
People from Suwałki Governorate
First convocation members of the Soviet of the Union
Lithuanian Soviet Socialist Republic people
Lithuanian women poets
Vytautas Magnus University alumni
20th-century women writers
20th-century poets
Stalin Prize winners
Deaths from liver cancer
Deaths from cancer in the Soviet Union
20th-century Lithuanian women writers
Burials at Petrašiūnai Cemetery
Deaths from cancer in Russia